Brackley is a rural municipality in Prince Edward Island, Canada. It is located on the northern boundary of Charlottetown, adjoining the Charlottetown Airport that is in the neighbourhood of Sherwood. Brackley originally incorporated in 1983. It absorbed the adjacent former municipality of Winsloe South via amalgamation on December 15, 2017.

Demographics 

References 

Communities in Queens County, Prince Edward Island
Rural municipalities in Prince Edward Island